Hibernian Football Club, commonly known as "Hibs", is a professional football club based in the Leith area of Edinburgh, Scotland. The club was founded in 1875 by members of Edinburgh's Irish community, and named after the Roman word for Ireland. Home matches are played at Easter Road Stadium, which has been in use since 1893. The club joined the Scottish Football League in that year, and has since played in the Scottish Premier League (1999–2013) and since 2013 it has played in the Scottish Professional Football League.

This list encompasses the major honours won by Hibernian, records set by the club, their managers and their players. The player records section includes details of the club's leading goalscorers and those who have made most appearances in first-team competitions. It also records notable achievements by Hibernian players in international play, and the highest transfer fees paid and received by the club. Attendance records at Easter Road are also included in the list.

Honours

Hibernian have won the Scottish league championship four times, most recently in 1952. Three of those four championships were won between 1948 and 1952, when the club had the services of The Famous Five, a notable forward line. The club have won the Scottish Cup three times, in 1887, 1902 and 2016, with the latter victory ending a notorious drought. Hibs have also won the Scottish League Cup three times, in 1972, 1991 and 2007.

Major domestic honours

Scottish league, first tier
Winners (4): 1902–03, 1947–48, 1950–51, 1951–52
Runners-up (6): 1896–97, 1946–47, 1949–50, 1952–53, 1973–74, 1974–75
Scottish Cup
Winners (3): 1886–87, 1901–02, 2015–16
Runners-up (12): 1895–96, 1913–14, 1922–23, 1923–24, 1946–47, 1957–58, 1971–72, 1978–79, 2000–01, 2011–12, 2012–13, 2020–21
Scottish League Cup
Winners (3): 1972–73, 1991–92, 2006–07
Runners-up (7): 1950–51, 1968–69, 1974–75, 1985–86, 1993–94, 2003–04, 2015–16

Other honours
Scottish league, second tier
Winners (6): 1893–94, 1894–95, 1932–33, 1980–81, 1998–99, 2016–17
Runners-up: 2014–15
Drybrough Cup
Winners: 1972, 1973
Summer Cup
Winners: 1941, 1964
Runners-up: 1942, 1945
Southern League Cup
Winners: 1943–44
Edinburgh Football League/East of Scotland League (1894–1908)
Winners: 1901–02
North-Eastern Cup (1908–1914)
Winners: 1910–11
Rosebery Charity Cup (1882–1945)
Winners: 22 times
Wilson Cup (1906–1946)
Winners: 14 times
East of Scotland Shield (1875–1990)
Winners: 49 times (record)
Glasgow Merchants Charity Cup
Winners: 1901–02
Coronation Cup
Runners-up: 1953
Dunedin Cup (1909–1933)
Winners: 1921–22, 1929–30

Youth honours
 Scottish Youth Cup: 3
 1991–92, 2008–09, 2017–18
 SPFL Development League: 2 (Previously SFL Youth/SPL U18/U19 league)
 2008–09, 2017–18

Player records

Appearances
Most appearances in all competitions: Gordon Smith, 636.
Most League appearances: Lewis Stevenson, 450.
Most Scottish Cup appearances: Arthur Duncan, 51.
Most League Cup appearances: Pat Stanton, 103.
Youngest first-team player: Jamie McCluskey,  (against Kilmarnock, 24 January 2004).
Oldest first-team player: John Burridge,  (against Partick Thistle, 15 May 1993).

Most appearances
Competitive, professional matches only (as of match played 18 February 2023).

Goalscorers
Most goals in all competitions: Gordon Smith, 303.
Most League goals: Lawrie Reilly, 187.
Most Scottish Cup goals: James McGhee, 26.
Most League Cup goals: Willie Ormond, 38.
Youngest goalscorer: Jimmy O'Rourke,  (against Dunfermline Athletic, 15 December 1962).
Oldest goalscorer: Jimmy McColl,  (against Cowdenbeath, 7 February 1931).

Top goalscorers
Competitive, professional matches only. Matches played appear in brackets.

1 Includes continental (European Cup / Champions League, European Cup Winners Cup, UEFA Cup / Europa League and Inter-Cities Fairs Cup), wartime and regional cup competitions.

International
First capped player: James Lundie and James McGhee (for Scotland, against Wales, 10 April 1886).
Most international caps while a Hibernian player: Lawrie Reilly, 38 for Scotland.

Manager records 

Longest-serving manager by time: Dan McMichael, 14 years and 6 months (August 1904 to February 1919).
Longest-serving manager by games: Hugh Shaw, 604 (January 1948 to November 1961).
Shortest-serving manager by time: Franck Sauzee, 69 days (14 December 2001 to 21 February 2002).
Shortest-serving manager by matches: Franck Sauzee, 15 (December 2001 to February 2002).

Club records

Attendance
Highest attendance for a home match: 65,860 vs Hearts, 2 January 1950.
Highest league game attendance: 65,860 vs Hearts, 2 January 1950.
Highest Scottish Cup game attendance: 49,007 vs Rangers, 28 February 1973.
Highest League Cup game attendance: 53,000 vs Celtic, 2 October 1948.
Highest European game attendance: 45,000 vs Barcelona, 22 February 1961.
Highest average home attendance: 31,567 in the 1951–52 season.
Highest attendance for any match involving Hibs: 143,570 vs Rangers at Hampden Park, 27 March 1948.

Record victories
Biggest competitive victory: 15–1 vs Peebles Rovers, 11 February 1961.
Biggest league victory: 11–1 vs Airdrieonians, 24 October 1959, and vs Hamilton Academical, 6 November 1965.
Biggest Scottish Cup victory: 15–1 vs Peebles Rovers, 11 February 1961.
Biggest League Cup victory: 11–2 vs Montrose, 22 September 1965.
Biggest European victory: 9–1 vs Rosenborg, 2 October 1974.

Record defeats
Biggest competitive defeat: 0–10 vs Rangers, 24 December 1898.
Biggest league defeat: 0–10 vs Rangers, 24 December 1898.
Biggest Scottish Cup defeat: 1–9 vs Dumbarton, 27 September 1890.
Biggest League Cup defeat: 1–6 vs Hearts, 11 August 1956, and vs Rangers, 8 August 1959.
Biggest European defeat: 0–7 vs Malmö, 25 July 2013.

Transfers
Record fee paid: £700,000 for Ulises de la Cruz to LDU Quito in 2001.
Record fee received: £4,400,000 for Scott Brown from Celtic in 2007.

Footnotes

References

Sources

Hibernian
Records
Records